Trinity Cathedral is a historic church on Euclid Avenue at East 22nd Street in Cleveland, Ohio. It is the cathedral of the Episcopal Diocese of Ohio.

Building was begun in 1901 and added to the National Register of Historic Places in 1973.

History
Trinity parish was founded on November 9, 1816, in the home of Phineas Shepherd. As the parish grew, a new wood-frame church was erected on the corner of St. Clair Avenue and Seneca Street (now West 3rd Street) and was consecrated in 1829. This was the first church building built within the village limits of Cleveland.

In 1846, to meet the needs of a growing parish, plans for a larger, centralized building just east of Public Square commenced. The congregation moved into the larger stone structure in the Gothic style on Superior Avenue in 1855. In 1890, Trinity Church was offered to Bishop William A. Leonard for use as a cathedral for the Diocese of Ohio. The congregation would maintain the building and it would serve dual roles as the parish church and cathedral for the diocese. Shortly thereafter plans were developed to build a new cathedral in its present location.

Charles F. Schweinfurth was selected as the architect for the new cathedral and had originally planned a Romanesque building. Bishop Leonard and the congregation strongly objected preferring a Gothic structure that was more befitting to Anglican traditions. Construction began on the cathedral in 1901 and it was officially consecrated on September 24, 1907.

In 2002, Trinity Commons was completed which provided additional program and office space for the cathedral and diocese. Central to the Trinity Commons is a central piazza used for informal gatherings after services and serves as the entry space for the cathedral. In addition to meeting and office space, the Commons hosts an art gallery, coffee shop, and restaurant.

Deans

Yelverton Peyton Morgan 1882-1891
Charles David Williams 1893-1906
Frank Dumoulin 1907-1914
Henry Pryor Almon Abbott 1914-1919
Francis Samuel White 1920-1931
Chester Burge Emerson 1932-1951
Percy F. Rex 1953-1957
David Loegler 1958-1968
Perry Roberts Williams 1968-1989
William D. Persell 1991-1999
Tracey Lind 2000–2017
Bernard J Owens 2018-

See also
List of the Episcopal cathedrals of the United States
List of cathedrals in the United States

References

External links

Churches in Downtown Cleveland
Episcopal cathedrals in Ohio
Episcopal churches in Ohio
Churches completed in 1901
20th-century Episcopal church buildings
National Register of Historic Places in Cleveland, Ohio
Churches on the National Register of Historic Places in Ohio
Cathedrals in Cleveland